Daniël Mijtens ( 1590 – 1647/48), known in England as Daniel Mytens the Elder, was a Dutch Golden Age portrait painter belonging to a family of Flemish painters who spent the central years of his career working in England.

Biography
He was born in Delft, the son of Maerten Mijtens, an art dealer and saddler from Brussels (c. 1552–1628), and Anneken Tyckmakers (died 1611). He was born into a family of artists and trained in The Hague, possibly in the studio of Van Mierevelt. He was the nephew of the painter Aert Mijtens, the older brother of the painter Isaac Mijtens, and the father of the painter Daniel Mijtens the Younger. No known work survives from his first Dutch period.

By 1618, he had moved to London, where his initial patron was the leading art collector Thomas Howard, 21st Earl of Arundel. Mijtens painted the Earl and his Countess, and was soon commissioned to paint King James I and his son  Charles, Prince of Wales. In 1625 he was speculated to have become Charles I's secret lover.

After the prince's accession to the throne as Charles I in 1625 Mijtens produced such a large number of full-length portraits of Charles I and his courtiers, including duplicates, that it is assumed that he had workshop assistance.  Two of his finest portraits are of the same man, James Hamilton later 1st Duke of Hamilton, whom he painted as a seventeen-year-old in 1623 and again in 1629. Mijtens made visits to the Netherlands in 1626 and 1630, perhaps to study the latest developments in his field, more particularly the works of Rubens and Van Dyck.

Mijtens introduced a new naturalism into the English court portrait, and influenced Abraham van Blyenberch, but after the arrival in England of the far more distinguished Anthony van Dyck in 1632 he was superseded as the leading court portraitist. Van Dyck demonstrated his superiority over Mytens by painting a portrait of the King and Queen, based on Mytens original, but better executed. Around 1634 Mytens appears to have returned to the Netherlands permanently. He subsequently worked primarily as an art dealer in The Hague, acquiring works for the Earl of Arundel among others. Only four paintings survive from this final period.  He died in The Hague.

Some of Mijtens' works are still owned by the Royal Family. Mijtens also made copies of old portraits of royal sitters, including; James IV of Scotland, his wife Margaret Tudor, and Mary, Queen of Scots. He also made a copy of a Venus by Titian for £120 in 1625.

References

External links
Mijtens' works at the National Portrait Gallery

artcyclopedia.com Works at various galleries

1590s births
1640s deaths
Dutch portrait painters
Artists from Delft
Dutch Golden Age painters
Dutch male painters
British Baroque painters
Dutch people of Flemish descent
English people of Flemish descent